Melody type or type-melody is a set of melodic formulas, figures, and patterns.

Term and typical meanings 
"Melody type" is a fundamental notion for understanding a nature of Western and non-Western musical modes, according to Harold Powers' seminal article "Mode" in the first edition of the New Grove Dictionary of Music and Musicians .

Melody types are used in the composition of an enormous variety of music, especially non-Western and early Western music. Such music is generally composed by a process of centonization, either freely (i.e. improvised) or in a fixed pattern.

"Melody type" as used by the ethnomusicologist Mark  is defined as a "group of melodies that are related, in that they all contain similar modal procedures and characteristic rhythmic and melodic contours or patterns".

Most cultures which compose music in this way organize the patterns into distinct melody types. These are often compared to modern Western scales, but they in fact represent much more information than a sequence of permissible pitches, since they include how those pitches should function in the music, and indicate basic formulas which serve as a basis for improvisation. In non-improvised music, such as codified liturgical music, it is still usually clear how the melody developed from set patterns.

Melodic formulae and melody types in monodic traditions around the world 
 Nomos in Ancient Greek music

 Intonation formula (euouae, Noeane etc.) in Gregorian chant as used in psalm tones and certain genres such as the Tract
 Enechema in Byzantine chant
 Popevka in Znamenny chant
 Khaz in Armenian chant

 All Near and Middle East maqam-traditions (Arabic Maqam, Turkish Makam, Kurdish Meqam, Uyghur Muqam, Azeri Mugam, Uzbek and Tadzhik Shashmakom,  Persian Dastgah etc.)
 Raga in Indian music 
 Pathet in Indonesian music
 Chōshi in Japanese music

Extra-musical implications
In most cases, these melody types are associated with extra-musical implications, particularly emotions (see Indian rasa, for instance). They are also often associated with certain times. For example, most ragas are associated with a certain time of day, or a wayang performance in Java implies a certain succession of pathets.

Many of these traditions have a corresponding rhythmic framework. These include:
 Usul in Arabian and Turkish music
 Tala in Indian music
 Bentuk in Javanese music

See also
Formula composition
Matrix
Modal frame

References

Sources
 
 

 
Musicology